A Föhn cloud or Foehn cloud is any cloud associated with a Föhn (Foehn), usually an orographic cloud, a mountain wave cloud, or a lenticular cloud.

Föhn is a regional term referring to winds in the Alps.

See also
 Cloud types
 Föhn wind
 Nor'west arch
 Pileus

References
Defant, F., 1951: Compendium of Meteorology, 667–669.

External links
 American Meteorological Society
 Manual Of Synoptic Satellite Meteorology

Accessory clouds
Föhn effect